Amélie Rosseneu (born 18 January 1988) is a Belgian–Israeli former judoka and coach.

She won the gold medal at the 2012 Judo Grand Prix Qingdao competing for Belgium.

References

External links
 
 

1988 births
Living people
Israeli female judoka
Israeli martial artists
Israeli sportspeople
Israeli female athletes
Belgian female judoka
Belgian sportspeople
Belgian female athletes
Belgian emigrants to Israel